Fleet Point is a rocky point  northwest of Tent Nunatak on the east coast of Graham Land, Antarctica. The point appears in the aerial photographs of several American expeditions: United States Antarctic Service, 1939–41; Ronne Antarctic Research Expedition, 1947–48; U.S. Navy photos, 1968. It was mapped by the British Antarctic Survey (BAS) 1963–64, and was named by the UK Antarctic Place-Names Committee for Michael Fleet, General Assistant with the BAS Larsen Ice Shelf party, 1963–64.

References 

Headlands of Graham Land
Foyn Coast